The Lengyendi originates in Mátra,  above sea level, Northwest from Galyatető, Nógrád County, Hungary. It flows to North up to Nemti, where it flows into the Zagyva.

Settlements on the banks
 Nemti

Rivers of Hungary